The following is a list of teams and cyclists who took part in the 2022 Giro d'Italia.

Teams

UCI WorldTeams

 
 
 
 
 
 
 
 
 
 
 
 
 
 
 
 
 
 

UCI ProTeams

Cyclists

By starting number

By team

By nationality

References

2022 Giro d'Italia
2022